The Mesothelioma Applied Research Foundation (Meso Foundation, formerly MARF) is a nonprofit organization funded by charitable donations that in turn funds mesothelioma research, provides support services to patients, educates the public, and advocates in Washington, DC for governmental funding for mesothelioma research. The organization's mission is to eradicate mesothelioma, a cancer caused by exposure to asbestos, as a life-ending disease. 

Of its donors, 65% are individuals personally affected by mesothelioma. The remaining 35% include pharmaceutical companies, labor unions, plaintiff and defendant attorneys, and companies that have manufactured asbestos products.

To date, the foundation has funded over $11.1 million  in clinical research and is the host of the annual International Symposium on Malignant Mesothelioma. The organization was founded in 1999 and became tax-exempt in 2000. The organization's board of directors is composed by Marjorie G. Zauderer, MD, Memorial Sloan Kettering Cancer Center, Chair; Jessica Blackford-Cleeton; Cheryl Bruner, Esq.; Keith Cengel, MD, PhD, University of Pennsylvania; Patrick Forde, MD, Johns Hopkins University; Jason Foster, MD, University of Nebraska; Aaron Mansfield, MD, Mayo Clinic; Sanjay Popat, MD, PhD, The Royal Marsden; R. Taylor Ripley, MD, Baylor University; Buerkley Opalecky, MSN, RN, University of Chicago; Boris Sepesi, MD, MD Anderson Cancer Center; Daniel Sterman, MD, New York University; James Stevenson, MD, Cleveland Clinic; Antoinette Wozniak, MD, University of Pittsburgh; Bill Ziegler.

See also

 American Cancer Society
 American Lung Association
 Asbestos Disease Awareness Organization
 Lung Cancer Alliance

References

External links 
 Official site

Mesothelioma
Cancer organizations based in the United States
1999 establishments in the United States
Organizations established in 1999
Medical and health organizations based in Virginia